Vivian Reed may refer to:

 Vivian Reed (musical theatre actress), African-American actress, singer, and dancer
 Vivian Reed (silent film actress) (1894–1989), American silent film actress